Henry Richard Nicholls (20 January 1893 – 5 December 1962) was a British Labour Party politician. He worked in the London and North Eastern Railway painting coaches before his election.

He was elected at the 1945 general election as Member of Parliament for Stratford division of West Ham, and held the seat until the constituency was abolished at the 1950 general election.

References

External links 
 

1893 births
1962 deaths
Labour Party (UK) MPs for English constituencies
UK MPs 1945–1950